Tony Randel (born May 29, 1956) is an American film director and screenwriter.

Film career
In 1985, Randel (credited as Anthony Randel) produced the New World Pictures rework of the Japanese The Return of Godzilla into the English film Godzilla 1985. Randel's breakthrough into directing came when Randel, who had supervised the production of Clive Barker's Hellraiser, was hired by New World's President of Production, Steve White, to direct the sequel Hellbound: Hellraiser II. It received mixed reviews, but was a financial success. Randel also directed the live-action film adaptation of the manga Fist of the North Star. The film premiered on HBO and was released to video. He also directed one of [[Fangoria|Fangoria'''s]] low-budget films, Children of the Night'' (1991), which one critic described as obviously low budget, but with striking scenes.

Personal life
Randel is married and has two children.  In addition to his film career, he has stated his "other love" is radio.  He has been a licensed amateur radio operator since 1968.

Filmography

References

External links
 

1956 births
Horror film directors
Place of birth missing (living people)
Living people
Amateur radio people